Ayriclytus macilentus is a species of beetle in the family Cerambycidae. It was described by Bates in 1872.

References

Clytini
Beetles described in 1872